(born January 13, 1972) is a retired Japanese baseball pitcher who coaches for the Chunichi Dragons in Nippon Professional Baseball. He was formerly the set-up man for the San Diego Padres and the Texas Rangers. He was also the closer for Japan's 2006 World Baseball Classic winning team.

Otsuka threw a low-90's 4-seam fastball (tops out at about 94 mph) that is very straight, along with a hard, late-breaking slider. He employed an unorthodox pitching delivery wherein he lifted his lead leg up very slowly, tapped his glove, then fired to home plate, making his pitches look faster coming out of his hand and thus harder to pick up.

NPB career

MLB career

San Diego Padres
Otsuka came to the United States after several years of pitching in the Japanese League when his former team, the Chunichi Dragons, used the posting system to solicit bids from MLB clubs for the right to negotiate with him. The Padres offered the top bid, and signed him to a three-year contract on December 9, .

Otsuka made his major league debut April 6, 2004 against the Los Angeles Dodgers, earning the loss after giving up a walk-off single to Robin Ventura. He struck out Paul Lo Duca for his first major league strikeout.

On January 6, Otsuka was traded to the Rangers, along with pitcher Adam Eaton and minor league catcher Billy Killian, in exchange for pitcher Chris Young, first baseman Adrián González, and outfielder Terrmel Sledge.

Texas Rangers
Otsuka took over the role as the closer for the Rangers during the 2006 season, replacing Francisco Cordero, and recorded 32 saves while posting a 2.11 ERA. On January 13, 2007, T. R. Sullivan reported that, in an interview in Japan, Otsuka said "If there is the team which needs me as a closer, I am going to think about (the trade)". Due to Gagné starting the season on the DL, Otsuka began the 2007 season as the closer. With the trade of Gagne to the Boston Red Sox, Otsuka assumed the closer's role again. However, Otsuka went on the DL after experiencing tightness in his throwing shoulder. His stand-in was C. J. Wilson. Otsuka was not offered a new contract by the Rangers and became a free agent on December 12, 2007.

Post MLB and Retirement
On January 10, Otsuka announced that he would undergo elbow surgery.

Shinano Grandserows
Otsuka was the player-manager of the Shinano Grandserows of the Japanese Baseball Challenge League from 2012–2014. The team held his retirement ceremony on September 15, 2014.

Coaching career

Chunichi Dragons
Otsuka returned to the Chunichi Dragons on the 3rd of October 2015 as one of the second team pitching coaches.

In 2016, with first team pitching coach Shinichi Kondoh on leave to have hernia surgery, Otsuka helped lead the first team pitchers in spring camp. He however returned to working with the second team following Kondoh's return. On 26 September, Otsuka was unveiled as the pitching coach for the U-23 Japanese national team for the 2016 WBSC U-23 World Cup.

San Diego Padres
Otsuka rejoined the Padres organization in 2017 when he was announced as the bullpen coach of the El Paso Chihuahuas, the AAA affiliate of the Padres.

Personal life
Otsuka and his wife, Akemi, have one son, Toranosuke, and one daughter, Hikaru.

References

External links

1972 births
2006 World Baseball Classic players
Baseball player-managers
Baseball people from Chiba Prefecture
Chunichi Dragons players
Japanese expatriate baseball players in the United States
Kintetsu Buffaloes players
Living people
Major League Baseball pitchers
Major League Baseball players from Japan
Managers of baseball teams in Japan
Nippon Professional Baseball coaches
Nippon Professional Baseball pitchers
Osaka Kintetsu Buffaloes players
People from Chiba (city)
San Diego Padres players
Texas Rangers players
Minor league baseball coaches